Dausa railway station is a railway station in Dausa, Dausa district, in the state of Rajasthan, India.

It is administered by the Jaipur division of the North Western Railway zone of Indian Railways.

The main lines passing through Dausa is Delhi–Ahmedabad line via Ajmer (electric double broad-gauge line).

Named trains 
Named trains that stop at Dausa railway station include

 Code: DO
Mandor Express
Pooja Express
Ashram Express
Ajmer–Agra Fort Express
 Ala

A computerized announcement system has been provided at the station.

References

Railway stations in Dausa district
Jaipur railway division